Land of the Outlaws is a 1944 American Western film directed by Lambert Hillyer. This is the eleventh film in the "Marshal Nevada Jack McKenzie" series, and stars Johnny Mack Brown as Jack McKenzie and Raymond Hatton as his sidekick Sandy Hopkins, with Nan Holliday, Stephen Keyes and Hugh Prosser.

Cast
Johnny Mack Brown as Marshal Nevada Jack McKenzie 
Raymond Hatton as Marshal Sandy Hopkins 
Nan Holliday as Ellen 
Stephen Keyes as Frank Carson 
Hugh Prosser as Ed Hammond 
Charles King as Bart Green 
Tom Quinn as Vic - Henchman 
Steve Clark as Sheriff 
John Merton as Dan Broderick 
Ben Corbett as Curly - Wagon Driver 
Art Fowler as Slim Carter 
Bud Wolfe as Drake - Saloon Dealer 
John Judd as Jim Grant - Assayer

References

Bibliography
Martin, Len D. The Allied Artists Checklist: The Feature Films and Short Subjects of Allied Artists Pictures Corporation, 1947-1978. McFarland & Company, 1993.

External links

1944 films
1944 Western (genre) films
American Western (genre) films
Films directed by Lambert Hillyer
Monogram Pictures films
American black-and-white films
1940s American films
1940s English-language films